The 2016 Columbus Lions season was the tenth season for the indoor football franchise, and their first in American Indoor Football.

Schedule
Key:

Regular season
All start times are local to home team

Standings

Playoffs
All start times are local to home team

Roster

References

Columbus Lions
Columbus Lions
Columbus Lions